The Dickinson Memorial Library and Park is a historic site in Orange City, Florida, United States. The library is located at 148 Albertus Way. The park is located on the corner of East Graves Avenue and U.S. Hwy 17–92. It contains tables and park benches around a gazebo and two water fountains. It is adjacent to the library. Every Friday from 8 AM to 1 PM you can find a farmer's market located in the park, with a wide selection of fruits, vegetables, plants, baked goods and other great items. The park is also used for various City and community events including an annual summer music in the park program. It was added to the National Register of Historic Places in 1995.

The library is now known as the Orange City Library, and is part of the Deltona Region of the Volusia County Public Library.

References

External links
 Deltona Region of the Volusia County Public Library - includes the Orange City Library
 Volusia County listings at National Register of Historic Places
 Florida's Office of Cultural and Historical Programs
 Dickinson Memorial Library and Park
 Great Floridians of Orange City

Library buildings completed in 1919
Libraries in Florida
National Register of Historic Places in Volusia County, Florida
Education in Volusia County, Florida
Vernacular architecture in Florida
Orange City, Florida